Zbigniew Gryglas is a Polish entrepreneur, manager, politician, civil servant and philanthropist. He is a former member of the Sejm, and formerly the vice president of the Agreement political party. In the years 2019-2021 Deputy Minister of the State Assets and the plenipotentiary of the Offshore Wind Energy. From 2021 the supervisory board member of the biggest Polish energy group (PGE).

From 2015 to 2017 he was a member of Modern, however in 2017 he left the party citing worldview differences. In February 2021 he was permanently removed from the Agreement party.

He is married and has 3 sons.

References

1965 births
Living people
Members of the Polish Sejm 2015–2019
Modern (political party) politicians
University of Warmia and Mazury in Olsztyn alumni